Un Día Más En El Gran Circo is the 3rd album by British-Venezuelan singer-songwriter Jeremías released on 14 August 2007. The album earned a Latin Grammy Award nomination for Best Male Pop Vocal Album.

Track listing

 Un Día Más En El Gran Circo
 Juan de Afuera
 El Simple Juego del Amor
 Hasta El Próximo Invierno
 Este Tiempo Que Se Fue
 El Seductor
 Nada Fuera de Control
 Yo No Busco Nada Más
 Promesa de Amor
 Comienzo del Final
 Aire de Abril
 De Regreso a La Soledad
 Tú
 Un Días Más En El Gran Circo (Reprise)
 Tú (Versión Alternativa)

References

2007 albums
Jeremías albums